Hira is an Indian, Japanese, and Māori surname.

Origins
As a Japanese surname, it is written with a kanji meaning "even", "flat", or "peace"; the same character is also used for the Japanese surname Taira as well as the Chinese surname spelled Píng in Hanyu Pinyin (reflecting the Standard Mandarin pronunciation). 
Hira, or Heera, هیرا is a Kurdish given name for boys meaning “Gracious, Immense and Brave”. 
As an Indian name, it can also be spelled Heera, and originates from the Sanskrit word  meaning "diamond". Hira is also a Māori surname.

Statistics
Statistics compiled by Patrick Hanks on the basis of the 2011 United Kingdom census and the Census of Ireland 2011 found 293 people with the surname Hira on the island of Great Britain and one on the island of Ireland. The 1881 United Kingdom census did not record any bearers of this surname. The 2010 United States Census found 513 people with the surname Hira, making it the 42,308th-most-common name in the country. This represented an increase from 384 (51,024th-most-common) in the 2000 census. In both censuses, about eight-tenths of the bearers of the surname identified as Asian, while the proportion identifying as non-Hispanic white fell from 12% in the 2000 census to 6.4% in the 2010 census.

People
Farida Akhter Hira, Bangladeshi Awami League politician
Hitesh Hira (born 1971), Zimbabwean cricketer
, Japanese actor
Mannan Hira (1956–2020), Bangladeshi dramatist
Nari Hira, Indian publisher
Rehana Akter Hira, Bangladeshi Awami League politician
Rasheda Begum Hira, Bangladesh Nationalist Party politician
Rezaul Karim Hira (born 1942), Bangladesh Awami League politician, Minister of Housing and Public Works
Rhonda Hira (born 1965), New Zealand softball player
Ronnie Hira (born 1987), New Zealand cricketer
, Indian-born Japanese hotelier
, Japanese footballer
, Japanese actor

References

Gujarati-language surnames
Japanese-language surnames
Māori-language surnames
Punjabi-language surnames